Area codes 709 and 879 are the telephone area codes in the North American Numbering Plan (NANP) for the entire Canadian province of Newfoundland and Labrador.

History
The first telephone system was installed in Newfoundland in 1885, but domestic long-distance calls within the Dominion of Newfoundland could be placed on a limited basis only in 1921. The first long-distance call from Newfoundland to Canada was made on January 10, 1939, by using a shortwave radio link operated by the Canadian Marconi Company in Montréal. Shortwave radio also carried calls from St. John's to London, England.

When planning was completed for the original NANP area codes in 1947, Newfoundland had not yet become of part of the Dominion of Canada. No provisions had been made to include Newfoundland in the continental numbering plan, which later became the North American Numbering Plan. The Newfoundland telephone system was entirely manual, and dial telephones came to St. John's only in 1948.

After Newfoundland's Confederation with the Dominion of Canada was enacted in 1949, the first cross-province long-distance call was placed from St. John's to Port aux Basques in 1949.

Newfoundland was added to area code 902, which already covered the three Maritime provinces, and which remains in use throughout Nova Scotia and Prince Edward Island. New Brunswick and Newfoundland were split from area code 902 to area code 506 in 1955. In 1962, Labrador was split off and combined with Newfoundland to form a new numbering plan area, with own area code 709. Canadian direct-distance dial locations gradually increased over the next several years, beginning in 1958 with the country's largest cities, Toronto and Montreal. The area codes served mostly for operator routing purposes until customer dialing of long-distance calls became common in the 1960s.

The incumbent local exchange carrier for area code 709 is Bell Aliant, which is owned by Bell Canada, which was formed in 1999 as a result of a merger that included NewTel Communications (previously Newfoundland Telephone). There had been as many as nine companies in Newfoundland and Labrador until 1951. NewTel acquired the last independent company in 1988.

Area code 709 is expected to be exhausted by 2027, when Newfoundland and Labrador will receive an overlay area code, and ten-digit dialling will become necessary in the province. Area code 879 was assigned as the second code for the purpose of that overlay, but the relief has been suspended indefinitely. Area code 709 and three other Canadian area codes, 506, 807, and 867 have not been overlaid, still permitting seven-digit dialling.

The central office prefix 988 is used in the province, for the community of Norman's Bay.  The Canadian Radio-television and Telecommunications Commission has recommended using a three-digit code, most likely 9-8-8, for suicide prevention, after the United States has implemented the same code for the National Suicide Prevention Lifeline.  Consequently, ten-digit dialling would need to be implemented regardless of the introduction of the overlay.

Service area and central office prefixes

 Arnold's Cove: 463, 556
 Badger: 539
 Baie Verte: 297, 529, 532, 554
 Battle Harbour: 972
 Bay L'Argent: 373, 461
 Bay Roberts: 222, 680, 683, 703, 786, 787, 788, 983
 Beaumont: 264
 Belleoram: 881
 Bellevue: 442, 762
 Bell Island: 488, 849
 Birchy Bay: 659, 761
 Bishop's Falls: 258, 395
 Black Duck Cove: 877
 Black Tickle: 471
 Bonavista: 218, 468, 470, 476, 704
 Botwood: 257, 389
 Boyd's Cove: 259, 656
 Branch: 338
 Brent's Cove: 575, 661
 Brig Bay: 247
 Brigus: 527, 528
 Brown's Arm: 654
 Buchans: 672, 719
 Burgeo: 886
 Burin: 342, 891, 894
 Burlington: 239, 252
 Burnt Islands, Isle aux Morts, Margaree: 698
 Campbellton: 261, 262
 Cape Broyle: 432, 756
 Carbonear: 501, 595, 596, 597, 945, 978
 Carmanville: 291, 534, 858
 Cartwright: 938
 Catalina: 469, 477
 Centreville: 522, 561, 678
 Chance Cove: 460, 768
 Change Islands: 621
 Chapel Arm: 592, 593
 Charlottetown (Bonavista Bay): 664, 667
 Charlottetown (Labrador): 949
 Churchill Falls: 735, 925, 977
 Clarenville: 425, 426, 427, 429, 433, 466, 766, 907, 979
 Clarke's Head: 676, 767
 Codroy: 955
 Come By Chance: 472, 542, 557
 Comfort Cove-Newstead: 244, 246
 Conche: 622
 Cook's Harbour: 249
 Coomb's Cove: 887
 Corner Brook: 216, 289, 388, 412, 612, 619, 630, 632, 634, 637, 638, 639, 640, 660, 785
 Cottrell's Cove: 485, 491
 Cow Head: 243
 Daniel's Harbour: 898
 Deer Lake: 215, 299, 391, 633, 635, 636
 Degras: 272, 644
 Eastport: 303, 526, 677
 Englee: 866
 English Harbour East: 245, 376
 English Harbour West: 888
 Fair Haven: 878
 Fermeuse: 363, 718
 Flatrock: 437
 Fleur de Lys: 253
 Flower's Cove: 456
 Fogo: 266, 270, 863, 989
 Forteau: 931
 Francois: 842
 French Island: 934
 Freshwater: 213, 226, 227, 230, 286, 980
 Gambo: 524, 564, 674
 Gander: 234, 235, 256, 287, 381, 422, 424, 431, 571, 651
 Garden Cove: 549, 550
 Garnish: 328, 826
 Gaultois: 841
 Glenwood: 574, 679
 Glovertown: 520, 533, 563, 985
 Grand Bank: 353, 377, 832
 Grand Bruit: 492
 Grand Falls: 290, 292, 293, 358, 393, 486, 489, 572
 Grandois: 423
 Great Harbour Deep: 843
 Green Island Cove: 475
 Greenspond: 223, 269
 Grey River: 296
 Griquet: 623
 Hampden: 455
 Hant's Harbour: 586
 Happy Valley-Goose Bay: 217, 220, 414, 896, 897, 899, 929, 982, 998
 Harbour Breton: 323, 885
 Harbour Main: 229, 231
 Hare Bay: 523, 537
 Harry's Harbour: 624
 Hawke's Bay: 248
 Heart's Content: 583, 585
 Heart's Delight: 588, 590
 Hermitage: 880, 883
 Hickman's Harbour: 547, 559
 Hillgrade: 628, 827
 Hillview: 434, 546
 Hopedale: 933
 Horwood: 671, 892
 Humber Arm South: 789
 Jackson's Arm: 459
 Jamestown: 473
 Jeffrey's: 274, 645, 775
 Joe Batt's Arm: 658
 King's Cove: 447, 448
 King's Point: 268, 481
 Labrador City - Wabush: 280, 282, 285, 288, 413, 930, 944, 962, 987
 Ladle Cove: 670, 874
 Lamaline: 369, 857
 L'Anse-au-Loup: 927
 La Poile: 496
 Lark Harbour: 681
 La Scie: 566, 675
 Leading Tickles: 483
 Lewisporte: 535, 541, 569
 Little Bay: 267
 Little Bay Islands: 626
 Little Harbour: 465
 Little Heart's Ease: 435, 548
 Long Harbour: 228
 Long Pond: 240, 284, 480, 744, 781, 834, 835
 Lourdes: 271, 642
 Lower Island Cove: 584
 Lumsden: 281, 530
 Main Brook: 865
 Makkovik: 923
 Mary's Harbour: 921
 Marystown: 276, 277, 279, 332, 357, 567, 909, 981
 McCallum: 846
 McIvers: 688
 Millertown: 852
 Milltown: 882, 889
 Ming's Bight: 254
 Monkstown: 356
 Monroe: 663
 Moreton's Harbour: 684, 831
 Mount Carmel: 521, 578
 Musgrave Harbour: 655
 Musgravetown: 439, 467
 Nain: 922
 Natuashish: 478
 New Chelsea: 586, 591
 New Harbour: 580, 582
 Newman's Cove: 445, 446
 Nipper's Harbour: 255
 Norman's Bay: 988
 Norris Arm: 653
 North West River: 497
 Old Perlican: 587, 620
 Pacquet: 251, 565
 Paradise River: 845
 Pasadena: 394, 686
 Petite Forte: 428
 Pinsent's Arm: 951
 Plate Cove: 544, 545
 Point Leamington: 484
 Pool's Cove: 665
 Port Albert: 241
 Port au Port: 278, 648
 Port aux Basques: 694, 695, 696
 Port Blandford: 347, 543
 Port Hope Simpson: 960
 Port Rexton: 436, 464, 562
 Port Saunders: 298, 861
 Portugal Cove: 242, 560, 773, 895
 Postville: 479
 Pouch Cove: 232, 335
 Princeton: 462, 558
 Raleigh: 452
 Ramea: 625
 Red Bay: 920
 Reef's Harbour: 847
 Rencontre East: 848
 Rigolet: 947
 River of Ponds: 225
 Robert's Arm: 650, 652, 869
 Rocky Harbour: 419, 458
 Roddickton: 457, 774
 Rose Blanche: 956
 Rushoon: 374, 443
 Seal Cove (Fortune Bay): 851
 Seal Cove (White Bay): 531
 Seldom: 627
 Smokey: 961
 Sop's Arm: 482
 South Brook: 657, 868
 Springdale: 668, 673, 692, 867, 990
 St. Alban's: 324, 500, 538
 St. Anthony: 212, 449, 450, 454
 St. Brendan's: 669
 St. Bride's: 337, 519
 Stephenville: 214, 283, 641, 643, 649, 721
 Stephenville Crossing: 444, 646
 St. George's: 275, 647
 St. John's (including some suburbs): 221, 237, 260, 273, 314, 315, 325, 327, 330, 341, 351, 352, 364, 368, 383, 415, 551, 552, 553, 570, 576, 579, 631, 682, 685, 687, 689, 690, 691, 693, 697, 699, 700, 701, 702, 705, 722, 724, 725, 726, 727, 728, 729, 730, 731, 733, 737, 738, 739, 740, 741, 743, 745, 746, 747, 748, 749, 750, 752, 753, 754, 757, 758, 763, 764, 765, 769, 770, 771, 772, 777, 778, 782, 793, 800, 833, 844, 850, 853, 864, 948, 986, 997, 999
 St. Lawrence: 320, 359, 873
 St. Lewis: 939
 St. Mary's: 295, 525
 Summerford: 629, 723
 Summerside: 783
 Terra Nova: 265
 Terrenceville: 375, 662
 Torbay: 233, 400, 401, 437, 577
 Trepassey: 326, 438, 717
 Triton: 263, 421, 441
 Trout River: 451
 Twillingate: 304, 884, 893
 Upper Island Cove: 573, 589, 594, 720, 910, 984
 Victoria Conception Bay North: 596, 595
 Wesleyville: 348, 536, 540
 Western Bay: 598
 Westport: 224, 236
 Whitbourne: 759, 760
 Wild Cove: 329
 William's Harbour: 924
 Winterton: 583
 Witless Bay: 238, 334, 493
 Woody Point: 453

See also 

 Telephone numbers in Canada
 Canadian Numbering Administration Consortium

References

External links 
CNA exchange list for area +1-709
Telecom archives
Area Code Map of Canada

709
Area codes
Area codes